Project Cedar (also known as Operation Cedar, short for "Civilian Emergency Defence Aid to Russia") was a World War II project to deliver short-range aircraft from the United States to the USSR via Abadan, Iran in the Persian Gulf.

The project was initiated before the United States' entry into the war, a base was established on Abadan Island in March 1942. Oil tankers, returning from delivering oil to the United States, would take Bell P-39, Curtiss P-40, and Douglas A-20 parts to Abadan, where they were assembled into aircraft and flown to USSR.  The 82nd Air Depot Group was part of Project Cedar. Head of the project on the Soviet side was Leonid Ivanovich Zorin.

Another similarly secret operation, Project 19, was set up in Gura Eritrea to repair RAF aircraft.

See also
 Lend-Lease
 Persian Corridor

References

Airports in Iran
Economic aid during World War II
Military logistics of World War II
History of Khuzestan Province
Military history of Iran
Iran in World War II
Military history of Iran during World War II
Aerial operations and battles of World War II involving the United Kingdom
Military history of the United States during World War II
Military operations of World War II
Soviet Union–United States relations
World War II aerial operations and battles of the Eastern Front
World War II airfields in the Middle East
World War II sites in Iran